= Louis K.C. Chan =

American economist

Louis K.C. Chan is an American economist currently the Hoeft Professor of Business at University of Illinois Urbana-Champaign.

== See also ==
- American Economic Association
